Dyschirius pallipennis is a species of ground beetle in the subfamily Scaritinae. It was described by Say in 1823.

References

pallipennis
Beetles described in 1823